José Jacques Pena (born 26 November 1948) is a Portuguese sports shooter. He competed in two events at the 1984 Summer Olympics.

References

External links
 

1948 births
Living people
Portuguese male sport shooters
Olympic shooters of Portugal
Shooters at the 1984 Summer Olympics
Place of birth missing (living people)